RExcel is an add-in for Microsoft Excel. It allows access to the statistics package R from within Excel.

The main features are:
 data transfer (matrices and data frames) between R and Excel in both directions;
 running R code directly from Excel ranges;
 writing macros calling R to perform calculations without exposing R to the user;
 calling R functions directly from cell formulas, using Excel's autoupdate mechanism to trigger recalculation by R;
 using Excel as a GUI for R, making R functionality accessible through menus and dialog boxes instead of a command line-oriented programming style. Using this paradigm, the GUI package R Commander is available as an Excel menu bar.

RExcel works on Microsoft Windows (XP, Vista or 7), with Excel 2003, 2007,
2010, and 2013.
It uses the statconnDCOM server and, for certain configurations, additionally the rcom package to access R from within Excel.

References

Bibliography
 Baier T., Neuwirth E., De Meo M: Creating and Deploying an Application with (R)Excel and R R Journal 3/2, December 2011
Baier T. and Neuwirth. E. Excel :: COM :: R. Computational Statistics 22 (2007)
Heiberger R. and Neuwirth E.: R Through Excel, Springer Verlag 2009.
Neuwirth, E.: R meets the Workplace - Embedding R into Excel and making it more accessible. Paper presented at the UseR 2008, Dortmund
Narasimhan, B.: Disseminating Statistical Methodology and Results via R and Excel: Two Examples. Paper presented at the Interface 2007, Philadelphia
Baier, T., Heiberger, R., Neuwirth, E., Schinagl, K., & Grossmann, W.: Using R for teaching statistics to nonmajors: Comparing experiences of two different approaches. Paper presented at the UseR 2006, Vienna.
Konnert, A.: LabNetAnalysis - An instrument for the analysis of data from laboratory networks based on RExcel Paper presented at the UseR 2006, Vienna.

External links
RExcelInstaller at CRAN
RExcel's web site has a master installer RandFriendsSetup which installs R, many R packages, RExcel, and the infrastructure needed to run RExcel (rscproxy, rcom, the statconnDCOM server)

R (programming language)
Microsoft Office-related statistical software